Red Mountain is a  mountain in the Cascade Range, Washington state.

References

Mountains of Kittitas County, Washington
Mountains of Washington (state)